Rowdy is the thirty-second studio album by American country music artist Hank Williams Jr.  It was released by Elektra/Curb Records in January 1981. "Texas Women" and "Dixie on My Mind" were released as singles, both peaking at #1 on the Billboard Hot Country Singles chart. The album peaked at number 2 on the Billboard Top Country Albums chart and has been certified Gold by the RIAA.

Track listing
"Dixie on My Mind" (Hank Williams Jr.) – 2:37
"Texas Women" (Williams) – 2:29
"You Can't Find Many Kissers" (Williams) – 2:36
"Give a Damn" (Williams) – 2:34
"Ain't Much More" (Williams) – 2:30
"Ramblin' Man" (Williams) – 3:36
"I Got a Right to Be Wrong" (Dickey Betts) – 3:08
"Footlights" (Merle Haggard) – 3:54
"Tennessee River" (Randy Owen) – 3:06
"Are You Sure Hank Done It This Way" (Waylon Jennings) – 3:05

Personnel
12-String Acoustic Guitar: Bobby Thompson
Acoustic Guitar: Bobby Thompson, Jon Goin, Hank Williams Jr.
Banjo: Bobby Thompson
Bass guitar: Joe Osborn, Stephen Schaffer on "Ramblin' Man"
Congas: Larrie Londin
Dobro: Hank Williams Jr.
Drums: Larrie Londin
Electric Guitar: Fred Newell, Jon Goin, Reggie Young
Fiddle: Jerry Rivers, Lisa Silver
Harmonica: Terry McMillan
Horns: Irv Kane, John Gore, Terry Mead
Lead Vocals: Hank Williams Jr.
Keyboards: Alan Moore, Larry Knechtel
Mandolin: Kieran Kane
Marimba: Farrell Morris
Organ: Alan Moore
Steel Guitar: "Cowboy" Eddie Long
Tambourine: Farrell Morris

Charts

Weekly charts

Year-end charts

References

1981 albums
Hank Williams Jr. albums
Elektra Records albums
Curb Records albums
Albums produced by Jimmy Bowen